Trace amine-associated receptors (TAARs), sometimes referred to as trace amine receptors (TAs or TARs), are a class of G protein-coupled receptors that were discovered in 2001. TAAR1, the first of six functional human TAARs, has gained considerable interest in academic and proprietary pharmaceutical research due to its role as the endogenous receptor for the trace amines phenylethylamine, tyramine, and tryptamine – metabolic derivatives of the amino acids phenylalanine, tyrosine and tryptophan, respectively –  ephedrine, as well as the synthetic psychostimulants, amphetamine, methamphetamine and methylenedioxymethamphetamine (MDMA, ecstasy). In 2004, it was shown that mammalian TAAR1 is also a receptor for thyronamines, decarboxylated and deiodinated relatives of thyroid hormones. TAAR2–TAAR9 function as olfactory receptors for volatile amine odorants in vertebrates.

Animal TAAR complement 
The following is a list of the TAARs contained in selected animal genomes:

 Human –  6 genes (TAAR1, TAAR2, TAAR5, TAAR6, TAAR8, TAAR9) and 3 pseudogenes (TAAR3)
 Chimpanzee – 3 genes and 6 pseudogenes
 Mouse – 15 genes and 1 pseudogene
 Rat – 17 genes and 2 pseudogenes
 Zebrafish – 112 genes and 4 pseudogenes
 Frog – 3 genes and 0 pseudogenes
 Medaka – 25 genes and 1 pseudogenes
 Stickleback – 25 genes and 1 pseudogenes

Human trace amine-associated receptors
Six human trace amine-associated receptors (hTAARs) – hTAAR1, hTAAR2, hTAAR5, hTAAR6, hTAAR8, and hTAAR9 – have been identified and partially characterized. The table below contains summary information from literature reviews, pharmacology databases, and supplementary primary research articles on the expression profiles, signal transduction mechanisms, ligands, and physiological functions of these receptors.

Disease links and clinical significance
Ulotaront / SEP 363856 is a TAAR1 agonist in phase 3 clinical trials for schizophrenia and earlier trials for Parkinson's Disease psychosis.  The medicine has obtained Breakthrough designation from the US FDA.

See also 
 Olfactory receptor
 Odorant
 Pheromone
 Pheromone receptor
 Psychostimulant
 Thyronamine
 Trace amine

References

External links 
 

G protein-coupled receptors
Neuroscience